Zachary McDonald (born February 13, 1991) is an American former professional cyclo-cross cyclist. In late 2008, he won the U.S. Junior National Cyclo-cross Championships, followed by a 3rd place in the junior category of the Roubaix race at the UCI World Cup in January 2009. He won the National U23 Championships in 2012, before stepping up to the professional category where he placed 2nd the following year.

Major results

2006–2007
 2nd National Junior Championships
2007–2008
 1st  National Junior Championships
2009–2010
 2nd National Under-23 Championships
2011–2012
 1st  National Under-23 Championships
 1st Providence Cyclo-cross
2012–2013
 1st Providence Cyclo-cross Festival 2
 2nd National Championships
2013–2014
 1st Kingsport Cyclo-cross Cup
 1st Tokyo Cyclocross
2014–2015
 1st Resolution 'Cross Cup 1
 1st Resolution 'Cross Cup 2
 3rd National Championships
2015–2016
 1st Rapha Nobeyama Supercross #2

References

External links

1991 births
Living people
American male cyclists
Cyclo-cross cyclists
People from Bainbridge Island, Washington
Cyclists from Washington (state)